Phacusa subtilis is a moth of the family Zygaenidae. It was described by Hering in 1925. It is found on Java.

References

Moths described in 1925
Procridinae